Khalifa bin Zayed Air College (KBZAC) is a military air force academy and college of the United Arab Emirates Armed Forces and is the main training institution of the United Arab Emirates Air Force. It is located in Al Ain.

History
The college was first established as a school of aviation in June 1982 at the location of Al Dhafra Air Base in Abu Dhabi by the United Arab Emirates founding father Sheikh Zayed bin Sultan Al Nahyan. The school was established to prepare and graduate military pilots for the UAE Air Force that are knowledgeable of the Middle East landscape and environment. In 1984 the school was renamed to the Air College and was commanded by Sheikh Mohammed bin Zayed Al Nahyan.

Due to the increasing number of students and enhanced aviation technology a new headquarters of the college was established in the city of Al Ain in 1995. The new headquarters was opened in 1996 and the college was renamed to Khalifa bin Zayed Air College pertaining to its leader, Sheikh Khalifa bin Zayed Al Nahyan, then crown prince of Abu Dhabi.

In 2007 the college was officially accredited as one of the UAE's educational institute by the UAE Ministry of Education.

Curriculum
The college offers a Bachelor of Aviation in three aviation science and military aviation studies:
Aviation fighter
Helicopter aviation
Unmanned aerial vehicles technologies

The college also offers studies in military air support and graduates air defense officers.

Notable alumni
Mariam Al Mansouri – The first female fighter pilot of the United Arab Emirates
Hazza Al Mansouri – The first Emirati astronaut in space

See also
Zayed II Military College

References

Air force academies
1982 establishments in the United Arab Emirates
Education in the United Arab Emirates
Military academies of the United Arab Emirates
Universities and colleges in the Emirate of Abu Dhabi